David Henry Hoelscher (born November 27, 1975) is a former American football defensive tackle in the National Football League for the Washington Redskins.  He played college football at Eastern Kentucky University.

1975 births
Living people
People from Coldwater, Ohio
American football defensive tackles
Eastern Kentucky Colonels football players
Washington Redskins players
Frankfurt Galaxy players